Francisco Ramón Lojacono (11 December 1935 – 19 September 2002) was an Italian Argentine football player and manager. A midfielder, he began his playing career in Argentina with San Lorenzo, before moving to Italy to play with Vicenza, Fiorentina, Roma, Sampdoria, Alessandria and A.C. Legnano. Lojacono finished his career back in Argentina with Gimnasia La Plata. 

During his playing career Lojacono represented both Italy and Argentina at international level, and was part of the Argentine squad that finished third in the 1956 South American Championship. He obtained eight caps with Argentina, all of which came in 1956, and eight caps with Italy between 1959 and 1962, scoring 5 goals for the latter national team.

After retiring as a player in 1972, Lojacono began a career in coaching that took him to managing a numerous Italian clubs, namely Latina, Castrovillari, Benevento, Livorno, Cavese, Barletta, Casoria, Salernitana, Nocerina and Akragas.

Notes

References

External links 
 

1935 births
2002 deaths
Argentine footballers
San Lorenzo de Almagro footballers
Club de Gimnasia y Esgrima La Plata footballers
Argentina international footballers
Footballers from Buenos Aires
Italian footballers
Italy international footballers
Italian football managers
L.R. Vicenza players
ACF Fiorentina players
A.S. Roma players
U.C. Sampdoria players
U.S. Alessandria Calcio 1912 players
A.C. Legnano players
Argentine Primera División players
Serie A players
Serie B players
Serie C players
Dual internationalists (football)
Argentine football managers
Benevento Calcio managers
U.S. Livorno 1915 managers
U.S. Salernitana 1919 managers
A.S.G. Nocerina managers
Association football midfielders
U.S. Castrovillari Calcio managers